Catoptria furcatellus, the northern grass-veneer, is a moth of the family Crambidae described by Johan Wilhelm Zetterstedt in 1839. It is found in mountainous areas of Europe, including Fennoscandia, Wales, northern England, Scotland, the Alps and the Tatra Mountains.

The wingspan is 21–24 mm. Adults are on wing from June to August.

The larvae probably feed on Lycopodium and Festuca ovina.

External links
UKMoths
Swedish Moths

Crambini
Moths of Europe
Moths described in 1839